Six Flags Hill is a hill located on Interstate 20 west of Atlanta, Georgia.  It is about a mile west of the Six Flags Over Georgia theme park, and is a major reference point for Atlanta radio and television traffic reporters.

Motorists travelling eastbound on I-20 typically get their first glimpse of downtown Atlanta when passing over Six Flags Hill.

The entire hill is part of a unique geological formation called "the Buford Uprising."  The size and location of the geological formation is unique and not in keeping the surrounding formations.  Nearby, Sweetwater Creek State Park has the ruins of Antebellum textile factory which was built to harness the water energy associated with this uprising.  The factory was destroyed by forces under the command of General William T. Sherman, US Army during the American Civil War.

Landforms of Cobb County, Georgia
Hills of Georgia (U.S. state)
Landmarks in Georgia (U.S. state)